= Balty, Virginia =

Unincorporated community in Virginia, United States

Coordinates: 37°59′51″N 77°26′42″W

Balty is an unincorporated community in Caroline County, in the U.S. state of Virginia.
